Nigeria sent a delegation to compete at the 2008 Summer Paralympics in Beijing, China. The country was represented by 28 athletes competing in four sports: powerlifting, table tennis, wheelchair tennis and track and field. The Nigerian team included eight powerlifters.

Medalists 
The Nigerian Paralympic delegation left the Games having won more medals than their Olympic counterparts.

Athletics

Men's track

Men's field

Women's track

Women's field

Powerlifting

Men

Women

Table tennis

Men

Women

Wheelchair tennis

See also
Nigeria at the Paralympics
Nigeria at the 2008 Summer Olympics

References 

Nations at the 2008 Summer Paralympics
2008
Summer Paralympics